Alessandro Michieletto (born 5 December 2001) is an Italian professional volleyball player and member of the Italy men's national volleyball team.

Career

Michieletto currently plays for Itas Trentino volleyball club as an outside hitter. His father, Riccardo Michieletto, is a former Italian volleyball player and his sister Francesca Michieletto also plays professional beach and indoor volleyball.

With the Italian national team, he was named to the 2020 Tokyo Olympics squad. In his Olympic debut versus Canada, he led all scorers with 24 points in Italy's five-set comeback win.

Honors

Club
2022 FIVB Club World Championship 
2021 FIVB Club World Championship 
2021-2022 Men Italian SuperCup  
2020-2021 CEV Champions League 
2020-2021 Men Italian Serie A1 
2020-2021 Men Italian Cup 
2020-2021 Men Italian SuperCup 
2018-2019 Men Italian Serie B Group B 
2022-2023 Men Italian Cup

Youth national team
 2018  U18 European Championship
 2019  2019 European Youth Olympic Festival
 2019  U19 World Championship
 2020  U20 European Championship
 2021  U21 World Championship

National team
 2021  CEV European Championship
 2022  FIVB World Championship

Individual
 2020: U20 European Championship - Most Valuable Player
 2021: CEV European Championship – Best Outside Hitter
 2021: U21 World Championship – Most Valuable Player
 2021: FIVB Club World Championship – Best Outside Spiker
 2022: FIVB Club World Championship – Best Outside Spiker

References

2001 births
Living people
People from Desenzano del Garda
Italian men's volleyball players
Italian Champions of men's volleyball
Olympic volleyball players of Italy
Volleyball players at the 2020 Summer Olympics
Outside hitters
Sportspeople from the Province of Brescia